The Longest Night (known during the production stage as Baruca) is a Spanish prison thriller television series created by Víctor Sierra and Xosé Morais. Its ensemble cast includes Luis Callejo, Alberto Ammann and Bárbara Goenaga.

Plot 
The plot concerns the attempts to extract a prisoner (Simón Lago) from the Prison of Monte Baruca on Christmas Eve.

Cast

Production 
The series was created by Víctor Sierra and Xosé Morais and directed by Óscar Pedraza and Moisés Ramos. It was produced by LaZona for Netflix. Shooting began in 2021. Shooting locations included Madrid and Aranjuez.

Release 
Consisting of 6 episodes, the series was released on 8 July 2022 on Netflix.

References

External links 
 

2022 Spanish television series debuts
Spanish thriller television series
Television shows filmed in Spain
2020s Spanish drama television series
Spanish-language Netflix original programming
Spanish prison television series